Nopaltepec could refer to one of two locations in the Republic of Mexico:

 Nopaltepec, State of Mexico
 Nopaltepec, Veracruz